BRP Capones (MRRV-4404) is the fourth ship of the Parola-class patrol vessels of the Philippine Coast Guard.

Design and features
The Philippine Coast Guard clarified that the ship is a law enforcement vessel and is designed to conduct environmental and humanitarian missions, as well as maritime security operations and patrol missions.

The ship was designed with a bulletproof navigation bridge, and is equipped with fire monitors, night vision capability, a work boat, and radio direction finder capability.

The ship will be equipped with communications and radio monitoring equipment from Rohde & Schwarz, specifically the M3SR Series 4400 and Series 4100 software-defined communication radios, and DDF205 radio monitoring equipment. These equipment enhances the ship's reconnaissance, pursuit and communications capabilities.

Delivery and Commissioning
According to The Philippine Star reported on May 21, 2017, Philippine Coast Guard spokesman Commander Armand Balilo said BRP Capones have arrived in Philippines on May 16.

She was commissioned into service on November 21, 2017 together with the BRP Suluan (MRRV-4406) and BRP Sindangan (MRRV-4407).

Service history
In May 2018, the BRP Capones participated in a fluvial procession in Manila Bay by carrying the image of the Our Lady of Mount Carmel.

In September 2018, the ship assisted in the firefighting operations on the MV Lite Ferry 28 which caught fire while docked in Argao, Cebu. The fire was immediately put out and no casualties were reported among the ship’s 92 passengers and 29 crew members.

In October 2018, the BRP Capones towed the vessel M/V Mags Royal back to port after the ship ran aground off Bansaan Island in Talibon, Bohol, suffering a  nine-by-six-inch hole in the hull near the rudder. All of the M/V Royal's passengers and crew were brought back to safety.

References

Parola-class patrol boats
2017 ships
Ships built by Japan Marine United